Regulation & Governance is a quarterly peer-reviewed academic journal devoted to the study of government regulations by social scientists. It was established in 2007 and is published by John Wiley & Sons. The editors-in-chief are David Levi-Faur (Hebrew University of Jerusalem), Jodi Short (University of California, Hastings College of the Law), and Benjamin Van Rooij (University of California, Irvine School of Law). According to the Journal Citation Reports, the journal has a 2020 impact factor of 5.400, ranking it 4th out of 48 journals in the category "Public Administration", 13th out of 183 journals in the category "Political Science" and 3rd out of 151 journals in the category "Law".

See also 
 List of political science journals
 List of law journals

References

External links

Political science journals
Quarterly journals
English-language journals
Publications established in 2007
Wiley (publisher) academic journals